Manzanita (Spanish for "little apple") is an unincorporated community in San Diego County, California, United States.

References

Unincorporated communities in California
Unincorporated communities in San Diego County, California